Coronus may refer to:

Mythology
Coronus (Greek mythology), the name attributed to several Greek mythological figures
Coronus, a deity of the Lusitanian mythology, in the cultural area of Lusitania (in the territory of modern Galicia and Extremadura (Spain) and Portugal)

Fictional characters
Coronus, a character in the Anita Blake: Vampire Hunter series of novels
Coronus, a character in the Neophyte game series

Other
Coronus, a form of unconsolidated limestone
Argyrosomus coronus, a species of fish in the genus Argyrosomus
"Coronus strip", see Mono Airport